Lambson is a surname. Notable people with the surname include:

Barry Lambson (born 1958), South African former cricket umpire
Julina Lambson Smith, nee Julina Lambson (1849–1936), American Mormon leader

English-language surnames